was a warrant officer and ace fighter pilot in the Imperial Japanese Navy (IJN) during the January 28 Incident and the Second Sino-Japanese War. During the January 28 Incident on 22 February 1932, while assigned to the aircraft carrier Kaga's fighter group, Kuroiwa participated in the IJN's first official shootdown of an enemy aircraft in combat. In the shootdown, Kuroiwa and two other fighters from his unit destroyed a Chinese fighter aircraft piloted by American contract Pilot {Reserve} Lt Robert M. Short.

Disappearance
During the Second Sino-Japanese War in 1938, assigned to the 12th Air Group, Kuroiwa saw considerable action against Chinese air opponents. During his combat career, Kuroiwa was officially credited with shooting down 13 enemy aircraft. In 1939 he was deemed too old to continue with combat duty so Kuroiwa left the IJN and became a civilian pilot for Imperial Japanese Airways. On 26 August 1944 the civilian transport aircraft he was flying disappeared off the Malay Peninsula and neither the aircraft nor Kuroiwa was ever found.

See also
List of people who disappeared

References

External links

1908 births
1940s missing person cases
1944 deaths
Aerial disappearances of military personnel in action
Imperial Japanese Navy officers
Japanese civilians killed in World War II
Japanese naval aviators
Japanese World War II flying aces
Military personnel from Fukuoka Prefecture
Missing aviators
Missing person cases in Asia
Missing in action of World War II